The dark-rumped rosefinch (Carpodacus edwardsii) is a species of finch in the family Fringillidae.

It is found in Bhutan, China, India, Myanmar, and Nepal. Its natural habitats are boreal forests and subtropical or tropical high-altitude shrubland.

References

dark-rumped rosefinch
Birds of Bhutan
Birds of Northeast India
Birds of Myanmar
Birds of China
Birds of Yunnan
dark-rumped rosefinch
Taxonomy articles created by Polbot